Sewak is a 1975 Bollywood film, starring Vinod Khanna, Neetu Singh in lead roles. It was directed by S. M. Abbas.

Cast
Vinod Khanna as Mohan
Neetu Singh as Rasiya
Bindu as Bindu 
Ranjeet as Deepak
Johnny Walker as Tripathi
Naaz as Neeru 
Shyama as Shobha

Music
Lyrics: Anjaan

References

External links
 

1975 films
1970s Hindi-language films
Films scored by Laxmikant–Pyarelal